Johanna Kurkela (born 25 April 1985) is a Finnish singer. Her first published work was a duet Tahdon tanssia kanssasi with Tomi Metsäketo in 2004. Kurkela released her first album Hetki hiljaa in 2005. She got a lot of publicity in the Finnish Preselection final for the Eurovision Song Contest 2007, presenting the song Olet uneni kaunein. Kurkela ended up sixth in the preselection final. A few weeks later she published her second album Marmoritaivas. She also contributed vocals to two tracks on Sonata Arctica's album The Days of Grays. Her 2010 album Hyvästi, Dolores Haze has sold over 20,000 copies.

Personal life 
Kurkela was born in Lumijoki. She has been in a relationship with Finnish musician and Nightwish founder and leader Tuomas Holopainen since 2009; they became engaged in 2014 and married on 28 October 2015.

Musical background 
Kurkela has a versatile musical background. She studied the violin for seven years from the age of five, and the classical piano from a few years later. She attended secondary school in Oulu at Madetojan musiikkilukio (an upper secondary school, otherwise known as a gymnasium in other parts of Europe) specializing in music.

In addition to singing Kurkela studies in a university of applied sciences.

Discography

Albums 
Studio albums

Compilation albums

Singles

Collaborative works 
2004: Tomi Metsäketo – Tummaa samettia: Tahdon tanssia kanssasi (duet)
2005: Tilkkutäkki 1: Hiljainen kaupunki
2006: Tilkkutäkki 2: Kuule minun ääneni
2007: Tilkkutäkki 3: Elämä on nyt
2009: Sonata Arctica – The Days of Grays (vocals on "Deathaura" and "No Dream Can Heal a Broken Heart")
2009: Vesa-Matti Loiri – Hyvää puuta
2009: Club for Five – You're The Voice: Nothing Else Matters
2014: Music Inspired by the Life and Times of Scrooge (vocals)
2018: Auri – Auri (vocals)
2018: Korsukylä – Every Green in May & Johanna Kurkela (vocals)
2020: Nightwish – Human. :II: Nature. (spoken words on "Shoemaker")
2020: Altamullan Road – Altamullan Road (vocals & composition)
2021: Auri – – II – Those We Don't Speak Of
2022: Vita Nova (vocals)
2023: Insomnium – Anno 1696

References

External links 
 
 

1985 births
Living people
People from Lumijoki
21st-century Finnish women singers
Warner Music Group artists
Auri (band) members
Finnish pop singers